Carhuapampa District is one of ten districts of the Ocros Province in Peru.

See also 
 Uchku

References

Districts of the Ocros Province
Districts of the Ancash Region